Maydown ( meaning "plain of the stronghold") is a small village and townland in County Londonderry, Northern Ireland. It is near Derry and Strathfoyle and is within the Derry and Strabane district. In the 2001 Census it had a population of 270 people.

Industry 

Maydown is an industrial zone and was the site of the first DuPont production facility in Europe. DuPont first invented Kevlar in 1965 and its Maydown manufacturing facility is one of only three places in the world where Kevlar is produced.

The DuPont site at Maydown is now the lead partner in the University of Ulster's Biodiversity Action on Industrial Site (BAIS) project that aims to enhance biodiversity on land close to industrial activity. DuPont has developed  of its Maydown site into wildlife habitats open to the public and a visitor centre used by local schools.

Maydown Precision Engineering was established in 1985.

Places of interest 
It was also the site of Royal Air Force Station Maydown, USAAF airfield and later transferred to the Royal Navy as Royal Naval Air Station airfield, RNAS Maydown, during World War II.

Sport 
Maydown F.C. is the local football team.

2011 Census
On Census day in 2011:
57.5% were from a Catholic background and 38.9% were from a Protestant background

References 

NI Neighbourhood Information System
Maydown wildlife habitats
RAF Maydown

Villages in County Londonderry
Townlands of County Londonderry
Derry and Strabane district